The Reiser-Zoller Farm was listed on the National Register of Historic Places in 1989.   The farm has a farmhouse complex consisting of a 1900-built two-story plantation-plain style building with a two-story front porch, linked to an original 1875-built one-story farmhouse.  It has about a dozen outbuildings including three barns.

References

Farms on the National Register of Historic Places in Georgia (U.S. state)
Houses completed in 1875
National Register of Historic Places in Effingham County, Georgia